The Nikon D3 is a 12.0-megapixel professional-grade full frame (35 mm) digital single lens reflex camera (DSLR) announced by the Nikon Corporation on 23 August 2007 along with the Nikon D300 DX format camera. It was Nikon's first full-frame DSLR. The D3, along with the Nikon D3X, was a flagship model in Nikon's line of DSLRs, superseding the D2Hs and D2Xs.  It was replaced by the D3S as Nikon's flagship DSLR. The D3, D3X, D3S, D4, D4s, D5, D6, D700, D800, D800Е and Df are the only Nikon FX format DSLRs manufactured in Japan.   The D3S was replaced by the D4 in 2012.

Technology 

The D3 features a full-frame 35 mm equivalent CMOS image sensor measuring 23.9 mm × 36.0 mm. This sensor is larger than the DX format sensors of all previous Nikon DSLRs, and Nikon has coined the term "FX format" to describe it. While the D3's sensor has larger pixels than some previous DX sensors, some previous DX sensors have larger pixels.  The design of the D3's CMOS sensor allows for greater light sensitivity than previous DX CCD sensors.  This allows the camera to reach higher equivalent film speeds and produce images with less noise in low light situations. Low light situations include times when the camera is operated at high shutter speed or high f number, where the lens' aperture is reduced to improve depth of field and sharpness. The sensor captures image data at 14 bits per color channel through 12-channel parallel readout, which ensures 9 frame/s continuous shooting with higher bit depth than that on previous 12-bit sensors.

Processed with the new Nikon EXPEED engine, the Live View mode in D3, along with D300, was Nikon's first implementation in its DSLR line-up. D3 also uses a stepper motor in aperture coupling mechanism for the first time, allowing real time depth of field control in Live View with exposure preview and live histogram functions. Additionally, D3 provides a lossless algorithm applied to RAW file along with uncompressed and lossy-compressed format.

The camera grip and body style were designed by Giorgetto Giugiaro's Italdesign. The camera body uses the Nikon F mount, making it compatible with older Nikon lenses. Other features include 9 frames per second in FX and 11 frames in DX and a large and bright LCD screen.

Three firmware updates have been released for the D3. The latest firmware version is 2.02. In this firmware version, the maximum ISO sensitivity allowed under Automatic ISO can be modified in increments the same as the manual ISO settings can, and automatic White balance and focus tracking are improved. In the 2.01 firmware update, automatic correction of lateral chromatic aberration is standardized, and Vignetting ("Vignette control"), lens distortion ("Distortion") correction, as well as image rotation ("Straighten") via playback ("Retouch") menu, are made possible.

The Nikon D3 has a hardware interface for direct geotagging with Nikon GP-1 GPS.

Audience
The D3 is Nikon's first full frame DSLR. Full frame can either offer greater resolution or larger pixels for improved sensitivity; in the D3 Nikon opted for a lower resolution, higher sensitivity solution. For additional resolution, the D3x was introduced. Full frame sensors also maintain the traditional focal lengths and depth of field associated with 35mm camera systems. Because it is Nikon's first such camera, it does not succeed or replace another camera model. Other professional-grade Nikon models included the D2Xs and D2Hs.

The camera has a vertical grip in addition to the standard horizontal grip.

When Nikon announced the D3, it was priced at US$4999, but present prices are much lower. In July 2008 the D3x's larger buffer memory was offered as an upgrade to D3 owners, doubling its continuous shooting capacity. This modification represents approximately 10% of the original cost of the camera. New D3 bodies still ship with the original buffer memory; upgraded models can be identified with a "2x" label in the storage card door.

As many other Nikon film SLR (various modified Nikon F, F3, F4, F5) and digital DSLR cameras like the Nikon NASA F4, Nikon based Kodak DCS 460, DCS 660 and DCS 760, Nikon D1, D2X and D2Xs, the D3 is used by NASA, for example in Space Shuttle missions to the International Space Station.

Reception
Popular Photography magazine determined that the Nikon D3 camera has excellent control of noise and can shoot in very low light at high ISO speeds with very usable results.

The DxOMark Sensor rankings issued by DxO Labs placed the Nikon D3 at fourth place behind two medium-format cameras from Phase One and the subsequent Nikon D3X.

The Nikon D3 was also tested by many independent reviewers.

Nikon D3X

The D3X is a higher resolution version of the D3 which was announced in December 2008. It features a 24.5 megapixel sensor, an ISO range of 50–6400, and a new image processing system.

Nikon D3s

The D3S was announced in October 2009. It features a redesigned 12.1 megapixel sensor, raises the maximum ISO up to 102,400 (equivalent), image sensor cleaning and adds a 720p video mode.

See also
Nikon D700
Nikon D3X
Nikon D3S

References

External links 

Nikon D3 – Nikon global website
Nikon D3 – Nikon USA website
Nikon D3 Microsite
Nikon D3 Review, review at Digital Photography Review

D3
D3
Live-preview digital cameras
Full-frame DSLR cameras